The Public Life of Henry the Ninth is a 1935 British comedy film directed by Bernard Mainwaring and starring Leonard Henry, Betty Frankiss, and George Mozart. This film was the first film made by Hammer Productions, and was Henry's film debut. It is set largely in the bar of the Henry VIII public house, with the title alluding to the 1933 Oscar-winning film The Private Life of Henry VIII.

Originally released in 1935 by Metro-Goldwyn-Mayer, it was released again in 1940, this time by Exclusive.

It is on the BFI 75 Most Wanted list of lost films.

Cast
 Leonard Henry as Henry
 Betty Frankiss as Maggie
 George Mozart as Draughts Player
 Wally Patch as Landlord
 Aileen Latham as Liz
 Mae Bacon as Landlady
 Herbert Langley as Police Constable
 Dorothy Vernon as Mrs. Fickle

Critical reception
The Monthly Film Bulletin called Leonard Henry "a likeable character in his first film," and assessed the movie as "good light entertainment without being riotously funny."

References

External links
BFI 75 Most Wanted entry, with extensive notes

1935 films
1935 comedy films
British comedy films
Films directed by Bernard Mainwaring
Films set in London 
Lost British films
Hammer Film Productions films
Metro-Goldwyn-Mayer films
British black-and-white films
1930s English-language films
1930s British films